('The Danish Ice Hockey Union') or DIU is the governing body of ice hockey in Denmark. It is a member of the National Olympic Committee and Sports Confederation of Denmark (DIF) and the International Ice Hockey Federation (IIHF). The association was founded on 27 November 1949 and became a member of the International Ice Hockey Federation the same year.

The union is responsible for all of Denmark's national ice hockey teams and organizes the Metal Ligaen, KvindeLigaen, and the other ice hockey leagues and tournaments in Denmark.

On 1 June 2014, seventeen ice hockey clubs and 4,252 players were registered with the DIU.

National teams 
 Denmark men's national ice hockey team
 Denmark women's national ice hockey team
 Denmark men's national junior ice hockey team
 Denmark men's national under-18 ice hockey team
 Denmark women's national under-18 ice hockey team

References

External links
 
Denmark at IIHF.com

Ice hockey in Denmark
Sports organizations established in 1949
Ice hockey governing bodies in Europe
International Ice Hockey Federation members
Ice hockey
1949 establishments in Denmark